Elena Zamura is a journalist from the Republic of Moldova. She is the editor in chief of 'Novoie Vremea' weekly.

Awards  
 Order of the Republic (Moldova) - highest state distinctions (2009)

References 

Living people
Year of birth missing (living people)
Place of birth missing (living people)
Moldovan journalists
Moldovan women journalists
Writers from Chișinău
Recipients of the Order of the Republic (Moldova)